The G series was the first rolling stock of rapid transit cars used on the Toronto subway, built 1953–1959 by the Gloucester Railway Carriage and Wagon Company of Gloucester, England, for the Toronto Transit Commission (TTC) of Toronto, Canada.

As the only Toronto subway cars to be manufactured outside of Canada, its design was mainly influenced by the Q38 and R stocks of the London Underground. Since the TTC's original concept for the subway system foresaw the use of rapid transit cars derived from the Presidents' Conference Committee (PCC) design of its streetcar network, the cars were also equipped with bulls-eye incandescent lighting similar to that of a PCC, and a small operator's cabin located in the front left corner of each car. To this end, it was influenced by the 6000-series cars used on the Chicago "L", felt through the work of DeLeuw, Cather & Co. of Chicago, whom the TTC contracted as a consultant for the rapid transit project.

The G-series cars were frequently described as "robust and reliable", despite being constructed overweight and energy-inefficient. The last G-series train ran on October 26, 1990, with the G series having been replaced by H-series trains. The only surviving cars, still mated in original condition, are fleet number 5098 and 5099, which are kept at the Halton County Radial Railway in Milton, Ontario.

Prototypes
Two mockup cars were delivered with slight variation from the final design:

 doors slid on the outside of the cars 
 more interior lighting
 no additional handle bars for standees
 ceiling vents – missing on final design

Design

A total of 140 cars were built. Most were steel-bodied and had painted exteriors; however, six G2-series experimental aluminum-bodied cars demonstrated the benefits of using aluminum for rapid transit car construction. The G3-class cars were built as "non-driving motors" in that they had motorized trucks but were equipped with an operator's cab without driving controls and thus could only be used in the middle of the train.

The G cars were originally designed in 2-car "married pair" formations, and were run in trains consisting of 2, 3 or 4 sets (4, 6 or 8 cars). When the G3-class non-driving cars were introduced in 1956, 14 pairs of the G3-class cars were inserted between G1-class cars to form semi-permanently coupled 4-car trainsets, which could be coupled to the 2-car sets or operated on their own. The G-series vehicles were the only subway trains with painted livery.

Retirement
Upon retirement from revenue service, several G-series cars were rebuilt or refitted for duties as subway work cars.

 5068/5069 converted to grinder cars RT-36/RT-37 in 1991 and are now retired
 5100/5101 converted to garbage cars RT38/RT39 in 1987 and were retired in 1998
 5102/5103 converted to grinding cars RT-34/RT-35 and were retired after an accident with a T1 subway car in 2004
 5104/5105 became tunnel washing units RT14/RT15 in 1988 and were retired in 1999

Scale models
Two 1/16 scale models of cars 5042 and 5043 were commissioned by Sir Leslie Boyce of GRC&W and constructed by Bassett & Lowke, and have been located at Hillcrest and Greenwood at various times. The model cars are stored and on display at the Hillcrest Training Centre.

See also
 6000-series (CTA)

Notes

References

G
Gloucester multiple units
Train-related introductions in 1954
600 V DC multiple units
Electric multiple units of Canada